Hernán Gómez or Hernangómez is a Spanish name and a surname. It may refer to:

 Hernán Darío Gómez (born 1956), Colombian footballer
 Pablo Hernán Gómez (1977–2001), Argentine footballer
 Juancho Hernangómez (born 1995), Spanish basketball player
 Willy Hernangómez (born 1994), Spanish basketball player

Hernangomez